Ardhangani – Ek Khoobsurat Jeevan Saathi is an Indian Hindi-language television series that aired on Zee TV from 29 October 2007 to 20 March 2008 based on the concept of how beauty turns into a curse. It concludes with the death of the lead character, Kangana, in the series' last episode.

Plot
The story is based on the life of a simple girl named Kangana, who belongs to a traditional Bengali family. Kangana is an exceptionally beautiful girl who knows that she can attract any man, but still hopes for a life partner who will admire, respect and want her for who she is, not her beauty. However, when her beauty becomes her curse, it changes her life forever.

Kangana's own family, who are jealous of her, try to destroy every happiness that enters her life. Kangana's childhood sweetheart, Priyam, comes back from America and their love story begins. Kangana falls in love with Priyam, as he has all the qualities she is looking for in her Prince Charming. Soon, she marries him, starting a new chapter in her life. But, life is not as straightforward for Kangana as she was expecting it to be.

Problems start arising in her life because of her beauty. Priyam cannot stand that his wife is far more talented and in-demand than him, and with every passing day, his insecurities about Kangana keep growing. He accuses Kangana of having an affair with his own best friend Nivaan and out of his lowliness complex, starts keeping an eye on her to know what she does and whom she meets. His suspicion grows so much that he starts raising his hand on Kangana. He gives her a permanent scar on her face so that she would look like a normal person.

In the end, Kangana commits suicide because she was raped and did not want to bring shame on the family.

Cast 
 Sudeepa Singh as Kangana Priyam Bhattacharya(nee Dasgupta): Priyam's late wife(2007-2008)(Dead)
 Ajay Krishnamoorthi as Priyam Bhattacharya: Kangana's widower(2007-2008)
 Chetan Pandit as Chandra Sen 
 Indira Krishnan as Sushmita Sen
 Melissa Pais as Roktima Sen / Bhattacharya
 Roma Sengupta as Thakur Maa
 Sonali Verma as Paromita Bhattacharya
 Gireesh Sahdev as Harish Bhattacharya
 Jay Pathak as Palash Bhattacharya
 Hemant Choudhary as Onir Bhattacharya
 Shalini Kapoor as Moonmoon Masi
 Himanshi Choudhary / Monaz Mevawala as Bipasha Mitra
 Gaurav Khanna as Nivaan Banerjee
 Mukul Dev as Business Man
 Sudha Chandran as Maushumi Bhattacharya 
 Ritu Vij as Sonalika Bhattacharya

References

External links
Official Website

2007 Indian television series debuts
2008 Indian television series endings
Indian television soap operas
Zee TV original programming